Masao Okahara (April 1, 1909 – July 14, 1994) was the 8th Chief Justice of Japan (1977–1979). He was graduate of the University of Tokyo. He was a recipient of the Order of the Rising Sun.

Bibliography
山本祐司『最高裁物語（上）』（日本評論社、1994年）（講談社+α文庫、1997年）
山本祐司『最高裁物語（下）』（日本評論社、1994年）（講談社+α文庫、1997年）

1909 births
1994 deaths
Chief justices of Japan
Japanese prosecutors
Grand Cordons of the Order of the Rising Sun
University of Tokyo alumni
People from Iwate Prefecture